FK Car Konstantin (Serbian Cyrillic: ФК Цар Константин) is a football club based in Niš, Serbia.

The clubs competes in the 2018-19 season in the Serbian League East, 3rd national tier.

Name origin
The name comes in honour of the Roman Emperor Constantine the Great that was born precisely in Niš, then called Naisus. He was the first Roman Emperor to accept Christianity initiating the expansion of the faith throughout the "civilized world".

The neighbouring areas of Bubanj, Ledena stena and the Rail station were formed mostly by the railway workers. From 1860 on the railway workers chosen as the traditional Serbian slava (the celebration of a patron Saint) the St. Emperor Constantin and Empress Helena and celebrated on June 3 of each year. The club was formed following the tradition of the Railway workers musical and singing society "Konstantin" formed in 1893.

Club formation
The club was officially formed on August 24, 1932 in the hotel "Atina" in the proximity of the railway station. After Sinđelić, Pobeda, Železničar, Građanski and Jugoslavija, Car Konstantin becomes the 6th football club in the city of Niš. The club founders were the population of the suburban area of Bubanj and Ledena stena, and the employees and workers of the railway station, "Car Konstantin" typography and the commercial cooperative society "Eparhija Niška" located in Niš since 1925.

SK Car Konstantin (1932-1944)
The club soon begins playing matches against other city clubs and other clubs from Serbia. The fair-play and fairness on the pitch have been the qualities specially cultivated. This way the club manages to a group a great number of followers and sympathizers. The club in this period won twice the Niš subassociation championship. The main player was Dimitrije "Mita" Belić.

References

External links
 FK Car Konstantin (Official Site)

Football clubs in Serbia
Association football clubs established in 1932
Sport in Niš
1932 establishments in Serbia